H.R. Pufnstuf is a children's television series produced by Sid and Marty Krofft in the United States. It was the first Krofft live-action, life-sized-puppet program (not including their previous work with the Hanna-Barbera program The Banana Splits Adventure Hour). The seventeen episodes were originally broadcast Saturday mornings from September 6, 1969, to December 27, 1969. The broadcasts were successful enough that NBC kept it on the schedule until August 1972. The show was shot at Paramount Studios and its opening was shot at Big Bear Lake, California. Reruns of the show aired on ABC Saturday morning from September 2, 1972, to September 8, 1973, and on Sunday mornings in some markets from September 16, 1973, to September 8, 1974. It was syndicated by itself from September 1974 to June 1978 and in a package with six other Krofft series under the banner Krofft Superstars from 1978 to 1985. Reruns of the show were featured on TV Land in 1999 as part of its Super Retrovision Saturdaze Saturday morning-related overnight prime programming block and in the summer of 2004 as part of its TV Land Kitschen weekend late-night prime programming block, and it was later shown on MeTV from 2014 until 2016.

In 2004 and 2007, H.R. Pufnstuf was ranked #22 and #27 respectively on TV Guides Top Cult Shows Ever.

Fast food chain McDonald's later plagiarized the series' concept for its long-running advertising campaign McDonaldland, and the company was successfully sued by the Krofft brothers for the copyright infringement.

Overview
The Kroffts created the H.R. Pufnstuf character for the HemisFair '68 World's Fair, where they produced a show called Kaleidoscope for the Coca-Cola pavilion. The character's name was Luther, and he became a mascot for the fair.

H.R. Pufnstuf introduced the Kroffts' most-used plot scenario of a fairy tale of good versus evil, as well as their second plot scenario of the stranger in a strange land. The show centered on a shipwrecked boy named Jimmy, played by teenage actor Jack Wild. He is 11 years old when he arrives on the island and turns 12 in the episode called "The Birthday Party". Jimmy and a talking flute named Freddy take a ride on a mysterious boat, but the boat was actually owned by a wicked witch named Wilhelmina W. Witchiepoo (played by Billie Hayes) who rode on a broomstick-vehicle called the Vroom Broom. She used the boat to lure Jimmy and Freddy to her castle on Living Island, where she was going to take Jimmy prisoner and steal Freddy for her own purposes.

The Mayor of Living Island was a friendly and helpful anthropomorphic dragon named H.R. Pufnstuf, performed by Roberto Gamonet and voiced by the show's writer Lennie Weinrib, who also voiced many of the other characters. The dragon rescued Jimmy and protected him from Witchiepoo, as his cave was the only place where her magic had no effect.

All of the characters on Living Island were realized by large cumbersome costumes or puppetry of anthropomorphic animals and objects. Everything was alive on the island, including houses, boats, clocks, candles, and so forth; virtually any part of the Living Island sets could become a character, usually voiced in a parody of a famous film star such as Mae West, Edward G. Robinson, or John Wayne.

Characters

Main
 Jimmy (portrayed by Jack Wild) – A young English human who was lured to Living Island by an enchanted boat. Witchiepoo controlled the boat with the aim of stealing  Jimmy's magic talking flute named Freddy.
 H.R. Pufnstuf (performed by Roberto Gamonet, voiced by Lennie Weinrib in a West Ohio accent) – A friendly dragon who is the Mayor of Living Island.
 Freddy the Flute (voiced by Joan Gerber) – A magic talking flute that is owned by Jimmy. He is often targeted by Witchiepoo.
 Cling and Clang (performed by Joy Campbell and Angelo Rossitto) – Two short mute keystone cops who work for H.R. Pufnstuf as his Rescue Racer Crew. Cling wears red and Clang wears green. Although they appear vaguely animal-like with their beaked faces, and furry three-toed feet, the Kroffts have said they are actually bells, hence their names.
 Wilhelmina W. Witchiepoo (portrayed by Billie Hayes) – The primary antagonist of the series; a wicked but ineffective witch who has been targeting Freddy the Flute to use him in her own agendas. She rides a large rocket-powered broom with a steering wheel called the Vroom Broom. She is cruel to everyone around her, even her henchmen, whom she constantly whacks with her wand. Yet when faced with failure, she usually starts to pity herself, by asking "Why me?"
 Orson Vulture (performed by Joy Campbell, voiced by Lennie Weinrib) – A stuffy, somewhat inept vulture who is one of Witchiepoo's henchmen. As her favorite flunky, he multitasks as her sounding board, butler, and co-pilot on her Vroom Broom. Orson once made the mistake of asking what the W. in his boss's name stood for. The answer: WHACK!
 Seymour Spider (performed by Angelo Rossitto, voiced by Walker Edmiston) – A dim-witted "spider" (appearance as a furry orange ogre with eight limbs) who is another of Witchiepoo's henchmen. As her second favorite flunky, he primarily serves her as an alternative sounding board and hairdresser.
 Stupid Bat (performed by Sharon Baird, voiced by Lennie Weinrib) – A bat who is the least favorite and least seen of Witchiepoo's henchmen. He mainly serves as her messenger. As his name implies, he is not very bright and his messages are usually delivered one second too late.
 Skeleton Guards – Two skeletons who guard Witchiepoo's castle. They are easily spooked, and will often run from danger in a flash, but not before their armor and capes fly off in a cartoonish fashion.

Others
 Dr. Blinky (performed by Johnny Silver, voiced by Walker Edmiston impersonating Ed Wynn) – An owl who is Living Island's local physician and scientist. Dr. Blinky is also the head of H.R. Pufnstuf's "Anti-Smog, Pollution, and Witch Committee". Other characters (including Polka-Dotted Horse) fear his medical incompetence and are terrified at the prospect of being treated by him.
 Judy Frog (performed by Sharon Baird, voiced by Joan Gerber) – A singing, dancing frog who is one of H.R. Pufnstuf's friends and the resident entertainer. Judy is based on Judy Garland, whom Sid Krofft had previous toured with and opened for.
 Pop Lolly (voiced by Lennie Weinrib) – A living lollipop who makes and sells candy and other sweet goods.
Cheese Guards – Two guards that are living pieces of cheese who work for Pop Lolly. They would often help Pop Lolly fend off a group of Hippie Ants who want to have free candy.
 Ludicrous Lion (performed by Johnny Silver, voiced by Walker Edmiston impersonating W. C. Fields) – A lion who works as a peddler and owns a horse-drawn wagon. He is quite cunning and not always so honest when it comes to money. Although slightly shady and greedy, he is officially one of the Good Guys where he would often help to thwart Witchiepoo's plots.
 Polka-Dotted Horse (performed by Felix Silla, voiced by Lennie Weinrib) – A good-natured but dim-witted horse who works for Ludicrous Lion.
 Tick Tock (performed by Andy Ratoucheff, voiced by Lennie Weinrib) – A mobile alarm clock that warns the good characters when Witchiepoo is coming and informs them of various other dangers.
 Grandfather Clock (voiced by Walker Edmiston) – A mobile grandfather clock who is married to Grandmother Clock.
 Grandmother Clock (voiced by Joan Gerber) – A mobile grandmother clock who is married to Grandfather Clock.
 Miss Wristwatch (voiced by Joan Gerber impersonating Zsa Zsa Gabor) – A glamorous rich mobile human-sized wristwatch.
 Hippie Ants - A group of ants that would try to have free candy from Pop Lolly.
 The Boyds - A bunch of birds that serve as Living Island's residential band. The Boyds are based on The Byrds.
Lady Boyd (performed by Sharon Baird, voiced by Joan Gerber) – A blue bird who is the lead singer of The Boyds. She was often seen singing the end theme to this show.
 Shirlee Pufnstuf (performed by Sharon Baird, voiced by Joan Gerber impersonating a younger Shirley Temple) – A dragon who is H.R. Pufnstuf's sister and a famous actress.
 Max von Toadenoff the Great (voiced by Lennie Weinrib) – A monocled toad who works as a film director. Max von Toadenoff the Great is based on Erich von Stroheim, but named for Akim Tamiroff.
 The Good Trees – Several walking, talking trees who always help out H.R. Pufnstuf and the good guys. In the film Pufnstuf, the song "Living Island" described them as the "Hippie Trees of Peace and Love". They consist of:
Hippie Tree – (voiced by Lennie Weinrib) A tree with sunglasses and dreadlocks who often speaks in hippie slang.
 Madame Willow (voiced by Joan Gerber) – Also known as the Dowager Tree, Madame Willow is an older, elitist female tree with a lorgnette.
 Chief Redwood (voiced by Walker Edmiston) – Also known as the Indian Tree, Chief Redwood dons a feathered headdress and speaks in the fashion of a stereotypical melodramatic Native American.
 There is an older, male tree who may or may not be the husband of Madame Willow.
 There is another female tree whose lips are always in the shape of an "O".
 There is a baby tree.
 The Evil Trees – Three trees on Witchiepoo's side that speak in a Transylvanian accent.
Evil Tree #1 – (voiced by Lennie Weinrib impersonating Béla Lugosi) – The leader of the Evil Trees.
 Evil Tree #2 – (voiced by Walker Edminston impersonating Peter Lorre).
 Evil Tree #3 – (voiced by Lennie Weinrib) A tree that always speaks in rhyme.
 The Mushrooms – A group of talking mushrooms on Witchiepoo's side that turn whoever touches them into mushrooms. The mushroom leader smokes a cigar and speaks like Jimmy Cagney.
 The Crustaceans – They are shown in several episodes as well as the closing theme song, some crab-like characters who are never named or introduced. There is a family of them, much like the living clocks and the living trees. They almost never say anything, but one of them has a couple of brief lines in "The Almost Election of Witchiepoo."
 Witchiepoo's Castle – A talking, living entity that is home to Witchiepoo and her minions. There is also a door inside the castle that is a separate living entity as well as living pillars.
 Dr. Blinky's House – A broken down house, propped up with crutches with a bandage on one side and an ice pack atop its chimney. It suffers from explosive sneezing that it has no control over. This usually sends Pufnstuf and friends running for cover, although it has been occasionally used to thwart Witchiepoo's plans enough for her to tell the house to cover its door when it sneezes. It houses several other inanimate talking characters such as fireplace (who speaks like Edward G. Robinson), a test tube (voiced by Walker Edmiston) and a candle (voiced by Walker Edmiston). There is a talking human skull (who speaks like Boris Karloff) and a few talking books, one of which is named Charlie (voiced by Lennie Weinrib). Charlie's brother, an evil black book of spells, is kept on Witchiepoo's nightstand.
 The Winds – The Winds of Living Island are often called upon by H.R. Pufnstuf to blow Witchiepoo out of the sky. They consist of the North Wind (voiced by Walker Edmiston in a shivering voice), the South Wind (voiced by Joan Gerber in a southern belle voice), the East Wind (voiced by Walker Edmiston in a Chinese accent), and the West Wind (voiced by Lennie Weinrib impersonating John Wayne).

Production
After creating costumes for characters in the live-action portion of The Banana Splits Adventure Hour, Sid and Marty Krofft were asked to develop their own Saturday morning children's series for NBC. The plot was recycled from Kaleidoscope, a live puppet show the Kroffts had staged in the Coca-Cola pavilion of the HemisFair '68 World's Fair. It included several key characters from this show, such as Luther the dragon and a silly witch. Other ideas were cultivated from Sid's life. As a child, he had charged friends buttons, not pennies, to view puppet shows in his back yard; buttons were standard currency on Living Island. Sid and Marty had toured with their puppets as the opening act for Judy Garland, and they based Judy the Frog on her. Ludicrous Lion bears more than a passing resemblance to Irving, the eponymous lion in a pilot they had made in 1957 called Here's Irving.

Sid's friend Lionel Bart asked him to view a rough cut of the movie adaptation of Oliver! Sid took notice of young actor Jack Wild and immediately decided that he was the kid whom he wanted to play the lead in his television series. Only two actresses auditioned to play Witchiepoo. The first was then-unknown Penny Marshall, but it was believed that she was not right for the part. Stage veteran Billie Hayes came in next, set into a maniacal cackle and hopped up on a desk. She was given the part on the spot.

For Marty Krofft, the production was a particular headache. Marty accepted guardianship of Jack Wild while the teenage boy was in the United States filming the show. He later described bringing Wild into his home as a mistake, considering that he already had his hands full with two young daughters.

Like most children's television shows of the era, H.R. Pufnstuf contained a laugh track, the inclusion of which the Kroffts were initially against. Sid Krofft commented "We were sort of against that, but Si Rose — being in sitcoms — he felt that when the show was put together that the children would not know when to laugh." Marty Krofft added "the bottom line — it's sad — you gotta tell them when it's funny. And the laugh track, (Si) was right. It was necessary, as much as we were always looking to have a real laugh track, a real audience. In comedies, if you don't have them (laugh track), you're in big trouble, because if you don't hear a laugh track, it's not funny. And that's the way the audience (at home) was programmed to view these shows."

H.R. Pufnstuf appeared in a segment of Sigmund and the Sea Monsters, and along with Witchiepoo in the Lidsville episode "Have I Got a Girl For Hoo Doo", where Hoo Doo conjures Pufnstuf as Witchiepoo's date for a witches' dance. The Krofft Superstar Hour also involved characters in two segments The Lost Island (which H.R. Pufnstuf was in) and Horror Hotel (in which Witchiepoo, Orson Vulture, Seymour Spider, and Stupid Bat are featured with Hoodoo). The Kroffts also loaned out the character, with Hayes reprising her role, for The Paul Lynde Halloween Special, in which she appears as the sister of the Wicked Witch of the West (portrayed by Margaret Hamilton).

Theme song
The show's theme song, titled "H.R. Pufnstuf", was written by Les Szarvas but is also credited to Paul Simon. Simon's credit was added when he successfully sued The Kroffts, claiming that the theme too closely mimicked his song "The 59th Street Bridge Song (Feelin' Groovy)". He is credited as the song's co-writer in TeeVee Tunes's Television's Greatest Hits Volume 5: In Living Color.

A cover of the show's theme song, performed by The Murmurs, is included on the 1995 tribute album Saturday Morning: Cartoons' Greatest Hits, produced by Ralph Sall for MCA Records.

Episodes

All episodes were directed by Hollingsworth Morse and written by Lennie Weinrib and Paul Harrison. (Robert Ridolphi also co-wrote Episode 1 "The Magic Path".)

Cast
 Jack Wild – Jimmy
 Billie Hayes – Wilhelmina W. Witchiepoo

Krofft puppets

Voice characterizations
 Lennie Weinrib – Bela Lugosi Tree, H.R. Pufnstuf, Dr. Blinky's Talking Book, Stupid Bat, Pop Lolly, West Wind, Akim Toadenoff the Great, Orson Vulture, Polka Dotted Horse, Jimmy as Movie Villain
 Walker Edmiston – Boris Karloff Tree, Dr. Blinky's Candle, East Wind, Grandfather Clock, North Wind, Chief Redwood, Alarm Clock, Dr. Blinky, Dr. Blinky's Test Tube, Ludicrous Lion, Seymour Spider
 Joan Gerber – Freddy the Flute, Grandmother Clock, Judy the Frog, Madame Willow, South Wind, Lady Boyd, Shirley Pufnstuf

Film

While the television series was still in production, the Kroffts were approached to do a film adaptation.  A joint venture between Universal Pictures and the show's sponsor Kellogg's Cereal, the 1970 film retained most of the cast and crew from the series and featured guest appearances by Cass Elliot as Witch Hazel and Martha Raye as Boss Witch. The movie was finally released on VHS in 2001 by Universal Home Video as part of its Universal Treasures Collection and on DVD on May 19, 2009. The film also included Googy Gopher, Orville Pelican, and Boss Witch's chauffeur Heinrich Rat, who were exclusive to the movie. A difference in the film is that the characters that had been voiced by Lennie Weinrib were each voiced by Allan Melvin and Don Messick.

The Kroffts have long had plans for a new H.R. Pufnstuf film. Sony first attempted a remake in 2000, but dropped the project. Eight years later, Sony again announced development on the project, but there has been no news since.

Tours
A number of USA stage show tours were run starring the same characters from the show. The most prominent of these was "H.R. Pufnstuf & The Brady Kids Live at the Hollywood Bowl", which was performed and recorded in 1973. This performance was released on VHS in 1997.

An elaborate H.R. Pufnstuf puppet show was featured at The Sid and Marty Krofft Puppet Theater at Six Flags Over Mid-Missouri in 1971. H.R. Pufnstuf and his pals Cling and Clang also made life-size appearances at the park. A section of the 1971 Six Flags Over Mid-Missouri map shows the location of the theater near entrance to the park's Sky-Way Ride.

Home media releases
In 2004, Rhino Entertainment/Rhino Retrovision released H.R. Pufnstuf: The Complete Series, featuring all 17 episodes on three discs, remastered and uncut, accompanied by interviews with Sid & Marty Krofft, Billie Hayes, and Jack Wild.  Pufnstuf, a major motion picture released in 1970, was also released on May 19, 2009, by Universal Studios. SMK and Vivendi Entertainment has obtained the home video rights to the series and released the complete series on January 11, 2011. Two versions of the release exist; one is a traditional complete series set, while the other is a collector's set, featuring a bobble-head of H.R. Pufnstuf.  The series is also available in Digital media format at iTunes Store.

In the United Kingdom, during 1986, Channel 5 Video released the opening three episodes of the television series on VHS.

McDonaldland lawsuit

The show was the subject of a successful U.S. federal lawsuit brought by the Kroffts against the fast food restaurant McDonald's, whose McDonaldland characters were found to have infringed the show's copyright. The case, Sid & Marty Krofft Television Productions Inc. v. McDonald's Corp., 562 F.2d 1157, was decided by the U.S. Court of Appeals for the Ninth Circuit in 1977.

Claims of drug references
The Krofft brothers have responded in several interviews to popular beliefs that subtle recreational drug references exist in the show. For example, the title character's name Pufnstuf has been interpreted as a reference to smoking hand-rolled (H.R.) marijuana (puffin' stuff); Marty Krofft has said the initials H.R. actually stand for "Royal Highness" backwards. The show's theme song lyric "he can't do a little, 'cause he can't do enough" has been read as referring to the addictive nature of drugs. Pufnstuf has quotes like "Whoa, dude!" and other "hippie" slang words. Lennie Weinrib, the show's head writer and the voice of Pufnstuf, has said, "I think fans gave it a kind of mysterious code-like meaning, like ‘Ah, was Pufnstuf puffing stuff? Like grass?’ Was it psychedelic? Was it drug oriented? Not to us, it wasn't." In a 2000 interview, Marty Krofft answered the question by saying, "The Krofft look has a lot of color, but there were no drug connotations in the show." He addressed the topic at length in an interview with the St. Louis Post-Dispatch in 2004, in response to the question, "OK, let's get this right out in the open. Is H.R. Pufnstuf just one giant drug reference?":

Authors of books on the show and its contemporaries, however, have not always accepted the Kroffts' alternative explanations for apparent references to drugs. David Martindale, author of Pufnstuf & Other Stuff, maintains that the Kroffts' desire to attract an audience who are now parents of impressionable children pushes them to downplay the double entendres: "But to deny it, the shows lose some of their mystique. The Kroffts prefer to remain playfully vague." Martindale said in another interview that he fully believes Marty Krofft's insistence that he did not use drugs, especially given that Marty's focus was that of a businessman, but Martindale describes Sid Krofft as "a big kid" and "a hippy", saying, "His comment when I told him we were going to do this book was—and I quote—'Oh, far out.' He says these shows didn't come from smoking just a little pot, and you could say, 'Oh, yeah. It comes from smoking a lot of pot.' But I think he was very deliberately doing double meanings so the show could amuse people on different levels."

Kevin Burke, co-author of Saturday Morning Fever: Growing Up with Cartoon Culture, argues that the "consistency of thought" in the rumors of drug references has a basis, although his co-author and brother Timothy Burke, a history professor at Swarthmore College, insists "human beings are capable of achieving hallucinatory heights without chemical assistance." Contradicting his own position, Marty Krofft has neither admitted nor hinted in occasional interviews that the references were made knowingly; in one case, a writer reported that when pressed as to the connotation of "lids" in the title Lidsville, "Well, maybe we just had a good sense of humor", Krofft said, laughing. His comments to another interviewer were more direct; in a Times Union profile whose author observed, "Watching the shows today, it's hard to imagine a show with more wink-and-nod allusions to pot culture, short of something featuring characters named Spliffy and Bong-O", Krofft conceded that the show's title had been an intentional marijuana reference, as had Lidsville, but "that was just a prank to see if they could get them past clueless NBC executives".

Parodies and tributes

 H.R. Pufnstuf appears in the eighth episode of the first-season of CHiPs, titled "Green Thumb Burglars", with his voice reprised by Lennie Weinrib. He is pulled over by Ponch (Erik Estrada) and Jon (Larry Wilcox) on one of Los Angeles' numerous freeways. Though he was referred to by name, while Jon maintained a sense of decorum about the actor inside the Pufnstuf suit, he let the good Mayor Pufnstuf off with a warning. Ponch later declared himself a "big overgrown kid", in reference to the kids' show.
 One of the most notable parodies of H.R. Pufnstuf was "The Altered State of Druggachusetts", a segment on the HBO comedy series Mr. Show with Bob and David. The sketch consists of a failed television pilot for a kids' show introduced by "Sam and Criminy Craffft" (portrayed by Bob Odenkirk and David Cross). The show itself is similar to H.R. Pufnstuf, with drug references made humorously overt. Instead of a talking flute, the boy carries a talking bong, and all of the residents in Druggachusetts take or are living incarnations of various drugs.
 Nike made a skateboarding shoe for their SB Dunk line named after the show, with the colors of the shoe resembling those of Pufnstuf.
 Excerpts from the show can often be seen playing on the TV in the hotel room Earl and his brother share in My Name Is Earl, and the October 18, 2007, episode features an extended scene with H.R. Pufnstuf as a super-crimefighter working alongside the title character's brother in a fantasy creative-writing exercise.
 In an episode of the TV sitcom George Lopez, H.R. Pufnstuf makes a guest appearance at a birthday party. Lopez dances with him and the theme song (without the parts referring to Jimmy, Freddy, the talking boat and Witchiepoo) is used as the music.
 An episode of the animated television series The Simpsons features a "Hufnstuf on Ice" show which has characters that resemble the cast of H.R. Pufnstuf. Another episode features a muffin shop in Shelbyville called "H.R. Muffinstuff".
 In the film Ace Ventura: When Nature Calls, the title character asks another character who is pushing him "Hey, what are ya, H.R. Shove n Stuff?"
 The series has been cited as a major influence to the Cartoon Network program Adventure Time.
 Todd Kauffman, animator and director of the Total Drama series, initially made a pitch for an animated adaption of H.R. Pufnstuf in 2005 complete with an animated opening sequence with the theme song covered and performed by Finger Eleven, but option rights costs led the project to be disbanded. Kauffman however, was later inquired to do the cover for the DVD release, "Sid & Marty Kroffts Saturday Morning Hits".
 In 2016, H.R. Pufnstuf, Cling, Clang, and Freddy the Flute appear in a crossover episode of Mutt & Stuff titled "H.R. Pufnstuf Comes to Mutt & Stuff!" with H.R. Pufnstuf voiced by Randy Credico with Mary Karcz providing the in-suit performance and Donna Kimball providing the face performance, Freddy the Flute performed by Kimball, and Cling and Clang performed by Arturo Gil and Joseph S. Griffo. H.R. Pufnstuf is depicted as the uncle of Stuff.
 In 2017, professor of religion Jeffrey Kripal wrote in his book Secret Body of the show's impact on his young life. "Disturbing," he recalled. "Who wrote this stuff? And puff'n on what stuff?"
 In 2018, reference to H.R. Pufnstuf is made in Season 2 of the Amazon Original show Goliath. In the show, criminal billionaire Tom Wyatt (Mark Duplass) recreates his own erotic memories/fantasies from his childhood while the intro to H.R. Pufnstuf is playing on the TV. Duplass' character on the show is fixated on individuals, male and female, who have lost their limbs. While having ties to the "La Mano Cartel" on the show, the head of the cartel, removes limbs, heads, etc., and sends these people to Wyatt to use in his fantasies. Each time before Duplass' character reverts to his fantasies, he says "H.R. Pufnstuf, who's your friend when things get rough?"
 During an interview, Magnús Scheving stated he was inspired by various show the Krofft Brothers produced (especially H.R. Pufnstuf) when creating Lazytown.

References

External links
70s Live Action Kid Vid
The Straight Dope - "Was McDonaldland plagiarized from the old "H.R. Pufnstuf" kids' TV show?"
DVD Verdict – Region 1 DVD review
DVD Times – Region 0 DVD review
"In Search Of..H R Pufnstuf" - The Nice Rooms Webzine
 

1960s American children's television series
1969 American television series debuts
1969 American television series endings
Pufnstuf, H.R.
NBC original programming
American Broadcasting Company original programming
American television shows featuring puppetry
Television series by Sid and Marty Krofft Television Productions
Television series by CBS Studios
Television series by Universal Television
Television series about children
Television series about dragons
Television series set on fictional islands